Brian Heron (born 19 June 1948) is a Scottish former footballer, who played in the Scottish Football League for Rangers, Motherwell and Dumbarton, and in the Football League for Oxford United and Scunthorpe United.

References

1948 births
Living people
Footballers from Glasgow
Association football wingers
Scottish footballers
Rangers F.C. players
Motherwell F.C. players
Dumbarton F.C. players
Oxford United F.C. players
Scunthorpe United F.C. players
Scottish Football League players
English Football League players
Baillieston Juniors F.C. players
Scottish Junior Football Association players